The 2018–19 season was Newport County's sixth consecutive season in Football League Two, 66th season in the Football League and 98th season of English league football overall. For this season the club kit was redesigned to match that worn during the 1938–39 Third Division South championship-winning season. County reached the League Two play-off Final but narrowly missed out on promotion. They also reached the fifth round of the FA Cup for the first time since the 1948–49 season, losing to eventual winners Manchester City.

Season Review

League
The season began with an away loss to Mansfield Town, leaving County in 23rd place in the league table. However, wins at home to Crewe Alexandra, Notts County and Grimsby Town, and an away 1–1 draw at Exeter City lifted Newport into the play-off places after five games had been played. The following two games away at Port Vale and Oldham Athletic were also won, further improving County's league placing to 2nd, missing out on the top spot on goal difference. In the next game, Newport suffered a surprising home six–nil loss to Yeovil Town, dropping to 3rd place, but still within the automatic promotion zone. After briefly rising to 2nd again following the home win against Cambridge United, County consolidated their position in 3rd place until the loss to Crawley Town put them back into the play-off zone. Following the home win over Colchester United Newport were again in 3rd place with 18 games played, but they slowly slipped down the table, falling as low as 15th after 33 games. However after the loss away to Northampton Town in the 36th game, County spent the rest of the season unbeaten, rising up the table back into the last play-off spot. However, going into the last game, any one of Exeter, Colchester, Carlisle or Stevenage could overtake them and qualify for the play-offs. Whereas the others all needed wins, Exeter could mathematically qualify with a draw, due to their superior goal difference. Into the last three minutes of the final game, both Colchester and Stevenage were winning, Exeter were being held to a draw and Newport were losing at Morecambe. This left County in 11th place with the clock ticking towards full time. However, a Jamille Matt equaliser in the 87th minute lifted Newport back into 7th place at full time. Only Exeter could overtake County now, and as their match was still in progress it was several minutes before the league placings could be finalised. With Exeter failing to score, Newport were confirmed in the play-offs.

Play-offs
County's opponents were Mansfield Town, and they would be hoping for a better result than the season-opening's three–nil loss.

In the home leg, Newport found themselves one–nil down after 12 minutes, only for the top-scorer Pádraig Amond to equalise in the 83rd minute, leaving things all square for the away leg. At Field Mill both teams played out the entirety of the 90 minutes and 30 minutes of extra time without a goal being scored. This took the game to penalties, with County to kick first.
Dan Butler scored for Newport, with Nicky Ajose restoring parity for the home side. Pádraig Amond for Newport and CJ Hamilton for Mansfield also scored. Mickey Demetriou scored for Newport, but Tyler Walker's penalty kick was saved by Joe Day. Next up for Mansfield was Mal Benning who had to score to keep his side in the game. His penalty initially hit the post before ricocheting off Joe Day and into the goal. Newport's next penalty kick was taken by Matty Dolan who made no mistake and booked County's place in the play-off final.

The final at Wembley was contested against Tranmere Rovers, who had been promoted to League Two in the previous season's National League play-off Final. Much like County's previous game with Mansfield, this too lasted the full 90 minutes without a goal being scored. However in the 89th minute Newport's captain Mark O'Brien was sent off for a second yellow card. This meant that County had to play the entirety of extra time with ten men. When it looked certain that this game would also go to penalties, Connor Jennings scored for Tranmere in the last minute of extra time to give them the win and promotion to League One.

Cup
County's FA Cup began with a trip to Southern League Metropolitan Police. Goals either side of half time by Pádraig Amond and Jamille Matt completed a comfortable 2–0 win for Newport. County were again drawn away in the second round, this time to National League side Wrexham. The game, broadcast on BT Sport, ended in a 0–0 draw, necessitating a reply at Rodney Parade. The draw for the third round had been made before the replay had taken place, with the winners rewarded with a home tie against 2015–16 Premier League champions Leicester City. Newport won the replay 4–0 and had still to concede a goal in the competition. In the third round, televised on the BBC, County took the lead against Leicester after just 10 minutes thanks to a Jamille Matt header. With the clock ticking down towards full time, Leicester's Rachid Ghezzal scored an equaliser in the 82nd minute. Newport had conceded an equaliser at exactly the same late stage in the previous season's fourth round match with Tottenham Hotspur, but this time they found an even later winner. Leicester's Albrighton conceded a penalty for handball, which was duly converted by Amond, to put Newport into the fourth round for the second season in succession. In the fourth round, County were drawn away at Middlesbrough, in what was dubbed the Transporter Bridge Derby. At the Riverside, Daniel Ayala put Boro into the lead in the 51st minute and that is how the score remained at the 90th minute. Despite piling on the pressure in the last ten minutes, Newport could not find an equaliser, until former Boro academy player Matty Dolan scored in the fourth minute of stoppage time to force a replay. The draw for the fifth round had been made before the replay had taken place, with the winners rewarded with a home tie against Premier League champions Manchester City. The Middlesbrough replay, broadcast by BT Sport, was a completely different affair to the first game, with Newport running out comfortable 2–0 winners in a game they completely dominated. Manchester City had won both their previous FA Cup games 7–0 against Rotherham United and 5–0 against Burnley, but they found County a much sterner test. Newport kept the scoreline to 0–0 at half time, but shortly after the break Leroy Sané scored for the visitors, but their expected goal rush never materialised. It was not until the 75th minute that City scored their second through Phil Foden. Pádraig Amond got a goal back for County in the 88th minute, leaving the score 1–2 in the 89th minute. However, almost immediately Foden grabbed his second, with Riyad Mahrez scoring City's fourth in the fourth minute of stoppage time. Although County were out, Pádraig Amond, who had scored in all five rounds, remained the FA Cup top goalscorer until Manchester City's Gabriel Jesus scored twice in their record-equalling final to share the honour. Newport had lost just two of their last 12 FA Cup matches, each time to one of the Premier League's 'big six' sides.

In the EFL Cup, Newport were drawn away to Cambridge United in the first round. County cruised to a 4–0 lead by the 90th minute, only to be denied a clean sheet by an Ade Azeez penalty. In the second round, Newport were drawn at home to Oxford United, but failed in their attempt at the Oxbridge double, losing 3–0.

Transfers

Transfers in

Transfers out

Loans in

Loans out

Competitions

Pre-season friendlies

League Two

League table

Result summary

Results by matchday

Matches
On 21 June 2018, the League Two fixtures for the forthcoming season were announced.

Play-offs

FA Cup

The first round draw was made live on BBC by Dennis Wise and Dion Dublin on 22 October. The draw for the second round was made live on BBC and BT by Mark Schwarzer and Glenn Murray on 12 November. The third round draw was made live on BBC by Ruud Gullit and Paul Ince from Stamford Bridge on 3 December 2018. The fourth round draw was made live on BBC by Robbie Keane and Carl Ikeme from Wolverhampton on 7 January 2019. The fifth round draw was broadcast on 28 January 2019 live on BBC, Alex Scott and Ian Wright conducted the draw.

EFL Cup

On 15 June 2018, the draw for the first round was made in Vietnam. The second round draw was made from the Stadium of Light on 16 August.

EFL Trophy

On 13 July 2018, the initial group stage draw bar the Under 21 invited clubs was announced. The draw for the second round was made live on Talksport by Leon Britton and Steve Claridge on 16 November.

Squad statistics

 

|-
!colspan=14|Player(s) who have left the club during the season:

|}

Goals record

Disciplinary record

References

2018–19
Welsh football clubs 2018–19 season
2018–19 EFL League Two by team